The College of Emporia was a private college in Emporia, Kansas from 1882 to 1974, and was associated with the Presbyterian church.

When founded, it was one of two higher education institutions in the city of Emporia, the other at that time was the "Kansas State Normal School" established for teacher training and was later renamed Kansas State Teachers College (KSTC) and reorganized in the mid-to-late 1970s as a state liberal arts college with the name changed to Emporia State University.  Since Emporia had two colleges before 1900, the city was sometimes called the "Athens of Kansas."

History 
The College of Emporia was founded in 1882.  In March 1909, the "Lewis Academy", a Presbyterian school in Wichita, consolidated with the College of Emporia.

Colonel John Byers Anderson of Manhattan, Kansas, donated his personal library to the college in 1888, and he served as president of the board of trustees of the college.  Twelve years later, a Carnegie grant provided the funds for the college to build the Anderson Memorial Library, in memory of John B. Anderson, whom Carnegie had known when younger and who later served on the board of trustees of the College of Emporia. The library was placed on the National Register of Historic Places on June 25, 1987.

The Registrar's office at Emporia State University is the official custodian of the transcripts for the former College of Emporia.

The college campus was purchased by The Way International for $694,000 and was operated as The Way College of Emporia from 1975 until 1989.

Athletics

The College of Emporia (CoE) athletic teams were called the Fighting Presbies. The college was a member of the National Association of Intercollegiate Athletics (NAIA), primarily competing in the Heart of America Athletic Conference (HAAC) from 1971–72 to 1973–74. The Fighting Presbies previously competed in the Kansas Collegiate Athletic Conference (KCAC) from 1933–34 to 1970–71, which they were a member on a previous stint from 1902–03 to 1922–23; as well as in the Central Intercollegiate Athletic Conference (CIC) from 1923–24 to 1932–33.

Football

Football was established in the late 1890s and existed until the college closed its doors in 1974. The team known as the red and white "Fighting Presbies" had a proud tradition—over 70 years of football the college won 14 conference football championships, including an undefeated, untied, and unscored on season in 1928.

In 1955, alumnus Lem Harkey was drafted in the sixth round by the Pittsburgh Steelers.  The college's most famous player and honored coach was Homer Woodson Hargiss.

Notable alumni
Faculty
 Football Coaches - Horace Botsford, Henry Brock, Harold Grant, Homer Hargiss, Lem Harkey, Gwinn Henry, Steve Kazor, Wayne McConnell, Walt Newland, Bill Schnebel, Lester Selves, Tom Stromgren

Alumni
 Dale Corson (1914–2012) - eighth president of Cornell University, physics professor at Cornell, author, served on National Advisory Committee for Aeronautics
 William Culbertson (1884–1966) - U.S. Ambassador to Romania and Chile, member of United States International Trade Commission, United States Army Colonel
 John Dalley (1935-) - violinist, violin bow maker, teaching at Curtis Institute of Music, artist-in-residence at the University of Illinois at Urbana-Champaign and University of Maryland
 Kyung-Chik Han (1902–2000) - pastor, church planter, recipient of the 1992 Templeton Prize for Progress in Religion
 Vic Hurt (1899–1978) - college coach for football / basketball / track, played football at College of Emporia
 David Hibbard (1868–1966) - missionary, educator, first president of Silliman Institute (now Silliman University) in Philippines
 Jerry Karr (1936–2019) - Kansas Senator, economics professor at University of Central Missouri, Wilmington College, Njala University
 Helen Marshall (1898-1988) - nursing historian, history professor at University of New Mexico, Eastern New Mexico University, Illinois State University
 Carroll Newsom (1904–1990) - eleventh president of New York University, president of publisher Prentice Hall, math professor
 Vernon Parrington (1871–1929) - literary historian and scholar, Pulitzer Prize winner, English professor at College of Emporia / University of Oklahoma / University of Washington, second head football coach at University of Oklahoma 
 Brock Pemberton (1885–1950) - Broadway theatrical producer, founder and chairman of the Tony Awards
 Arthur Samuel (1901–1990) - computer scientist, electrical engineering professor at Massachusetts Institute of Technology, computer science professor at Stanford University
 Jack Sinagra (1950–2013) - New Jersey State Senator, chairman of the Port Authority of New York and New Jersey
 William Allen White (1868–1944) - journalist, author, Pulitzer Prize winner, newspaper owner and editor of Emporia Gazette, founding editor of the Book of the Month Club

References

External links
 The Carnegie Legacy in Kansas, Anderson Memorial Library
 1921-1922 photo of students / faculty / campus of the College of Emporia
 May 1971 video of College of Emporia
 Then and Now: Lewis Academy
 Emporia - Home of William Allen White

 
Education in Lyon County, Kansas
Defunct private universities and colleges in Kansas
Educational institutions established in 1882
Educational institutions disestablished in 1974
Emporia, Kansas
1882 establishments in Kansas
1974 disestablishments in Kansas